Ekushey Padak (lit: "Twentyfirst Award") is the second highest civilian award in Bangladesh, introduced in memory of the martyrs of the Bengali Language Movement of 1952. The award is given to recognize contributions in a number of fields, including culture, education, and economics. The Ministry of Cultural Affairs administers the award.

The award consists of an 18 carat gold medal weighing 3 tolas and a certificate of honour. The medal was designed by the artist Nitun Kundu. The amount of the cash reward was originally ৳ 25,000, but it was subsequently increased to ৳ 100,000 as of February 2015

2010
Ekushey Padak was awarded to 15 people.

 Sayeed Ahmed, literature (posthumous)
 Mohammad Alam, photojournalism (posthumous)
 Ahmed Imtiaz Bulbul, music artiste
 Hanif Sangket, social personality
 Laila Hasan, artiste
 Imdad Hossain, artist
 Helena Khan, literature
 Partha Pratim Majumder, mime artiste
 Muntassir Mamoon, research
 Sangharaj Jyotipal Mohathero, social personality (posthumous)
 Golam Moula, Language Movement (posthumous)
 Mohammad Rafiq, literature
 AKM Abdur Rouf, artist (posthumous)
 ASHK Sadik, social personality (posthumous)
 Nasiruddin Yousuff, artiste

2011
Ekushey Padak was awarded to 13 people.

 Mosharef Uddin Ahmed, Language Movement (posthumous)
 Shawkat Ali, Language Movement (posthumous)
 Nurjahan Begum, journalism
 Jyotsna Biswas, performing arts
 Abdul Haq Choudhury, research (posthumous)
 Abdul Haque, language and literature
 Amanul Haque, Language Movement
 Md Abul Hashem, social service
 Mohammed Delwar Hossain, social service
 Shaheed Quaderi, language and literature
 Ustad Akthar Sadmani, performing arts (posthumous)
 Abdul Karim Shah, performing arts
 Polan Sarkar, social service

2012 
Ekushey Padak was awarded to 15 people.

 Humayun Azad, language and literature (posthumous)
 Mubinul Azim, fine arts (posthumous)
 Mumtaz Begum, Language Movement (posthumous)
 Baren Chakraborthi, science and technology
 Ehtesham Haydar Chowdhury, journalism (posthumous)
 Karunamoy Goswami, fine arts
 Enamul Haque, fine arts
 A.K. Nazmul Karim, education (posthumous)
 Monsur Alam Khan, education
 Suddhananda Mahathero, social work
 Tareque Masud, fine arts (posthumous)
 Habibur Rahman Milon (journalism)
 Ashfaque Munier, journalism (posthumous)
 Mamunur Rashid, fine arts
 Ajoy Kumar Roy, education

2013
Ekushey Padak was awarded to 13 people.

 Rafiq Azad, language and literature
 Asad Chowdhury, language and literature
 Samson H. Chowdhury, social service (posthumous)
 Udichi Shilpi Gosthi (arts)
 Ajit Kumar Guha, Language Movement (posthumous)
 Jamaluddin Hossain, arts
 Mohammad Kamruzzaman, Language Movement (posthumous)
 Kaderi Kibria, arts
 Tofazzal Hossain, Language Movement
 Nurjahan Murshid, social service (posthumous)
 Bijoy Sarkar, arts (posthumous)
 Enamul Haque Mostafa Shahid, Liberation War.
 MA Wadud, Language Movement (posthumous)

2014
Ekushey Padak was awarded to 15 people.

 Badrul Alam, Language Movement (posthumous)
 Biprodas Barua, language and literature
 Belal Chowdhury, language and literature
 Jamil Chowdhury, language and literature
 Samarjit Roy Chowdhury, arts 
 Ramkanai Das, arts 
 Rashid Haider, language and literature
 Shamsul Huda, Language Movement
 Enamul Huq, research
 Keramat Moula, arts
 Mujibur Rahman, social service
 Golam Sarwar, journalism
 Anupam Sen, education
 Abdus Shakur, language and literature (posthumous)
 SM Solaiman, arts (posthumous)

2015
Ekushey Padak was awarded to 15 people.
 Abdur Rahman Boyati, arts (posthumous)
 Arup Ratan Choudhury, social service
 Jharna Dhara Chowdhury, social service
 SA Abul Hayat, arts
 Mohammad Nurul Huda, language and literature
 Kamal Lohani, journalism
 MA Mannan, education
 Satya Priya Mahathero, social service
 Mujibur Rahman Devdas, Liberation War
 Faridur Reza Sagar, mass media
 Sanat Kumar Saha, education
 Pearu Sardar, Language Movement (posthumous)
 ATM Shamsuzzaman, arts
 Dwijen Sharma, language and literature
 Abul Kalam Mohammed Zakaria, research

2016
Ekushey Padak was awarded to 16 people.
 Kazi Ebadul Haque, language movement
 Sayed Haider, language movement
 Syed Golam Kibria, language movement (posthumous)
 Jasim Uddin Ahmed, language movement
 Jahanara Ahmed, arts (television and film)
 Pandit Amaresh Roy Chowdhury, arts (classical music)
 Shaheen Samad, arts (music)
 Amanul Haque, arts (dance)
 Kazi Anowar Hossain, arts (painting) (posthumous)
 Mofidul Hoque, Liberation War
 Toab Khan, journalism
 ABM Abdullah, research
 Mongsen Ching Monsin, research
 Jyoti Prakash Dutta, language and literature
 Hayat Mamud, language and literature
 Habibullah Siraji, language and literature

2017

The award was given to 17 persons.

 Sharifa Khatun, language movement
 Shushama Das, music
 Julhas Uddin Ahmed, music
 Ustad Azizul Islam, music
 Tanvir Mokammel, film
 Syed Abdullah Khalid, sculpture
 Sara Zaker, acting
 Abul Momen, journalism
 Syed Akram Hossain, research
 Alamgir Muhammad Serajuddin, education
 Jamilur Reza Choudhury, science and technology
 Mahmud Hassan, social welfare
 Omar Ali, language and literature
 Sukumar Barua, language and literature
 Swadesh Roy, journalism
 Shamim Ara Nipa, choreography
 Rahmatullah Al Mahmud Selim, music

2018
The award was given to 21 persons.

 AZM Takiullah (language movement)
 Mirza Mazharul Islam (language movement)
 Sheikh Sadi Khan (music)
 Shujeo Shyam (music)
 Indra Mohan Rajbongshi (music)
 Khurshid Alam (music)
 Motiul Haque Khan (music)
 Minu Haque (dance)
 Humayun Faridi (acting)
 Nikhil Sen (drama)
 Kalidas Karmakar (fine arts)
 Golam Mostofa (photography)
 Ranesh Maitra (journalism)
 Zulekha Haque (research)
 Muinul Islam (economics)
 Ilias Kanchan (social service) 
 Syed Manzoorul Islam (language and literature)
 Saiful Islam Khan (poet Hayat Saef) (language and literature)
 Subrata Barua (language and literature)
 Rabiul Hussain (language and literature)
 Khalekdad Chowdhury (language and literature)

2019
The award was given to 21 persons.

 Halima Khatun (posthumous - Language Movement)
 Ghulam Arieff Tipoo (language Movement)
 Monowara Islam (Language Movement)
 Azam Khan (posthumous - music)
 Subir Nandi (music)
 Khairul Anam Shakil (music)
 Liaquat Ali Lucky (art)
 Suborna Mustafa (art)
 Lucky Enam (art)
 Sayeeda Khanam (photography)
 Jamal Uddin Ahmed (fine art)
 Khitindra Chandra Baishya (War of Liberation)
 Biswajit Ghosh (research)
 Mahbubul Haque (research)
 Pranab Kumar Barua (education)
 Harishankar Jaladas (language and literature)
 Moinul Ahsan Saber (language and literature)
 Anwara Syed Haq (language and literature)
 Ashim Saha (language and literature)
 Imdadul Haq Milan (language and literature)
 Rizia Rahman (language and literature)

References

Civil awards and decorations of Bangladesh
Recipients of the Ekushey Padak